Lambert Woutersz (1602–1655), was a Dutch Golden Age brewer of Haarlem.

Biography
He was born in Haarlem as the son of Lambert and Magdalena Pietersdr van der Straten, owners of the brewery "Druyff". He was the brother of Francois with whom he was portrayed along with the rest of the officers of the local St. George militia  in Frans Hals' painting The Officers of the St George Militia Company in 1639. He was the flag bearer of the orange brigade and his brother Francois Woutersz was  a lieutenant of the white brigade.

He died in Haarlem.

References

1602 births
1655 deaths
Businesspeople from Haarlem
Frans Hals
Dutch brewers